Spring mot Ulla, spring! Cornelis sjunger Bellman (English: Run to Ulla, run! Cornelis sings Bellman) is a 1971 studio album by the Swedish-Dutch folk singer-songwriter Cornelis Vreeswijk. The album contains an unconventional presentation of Carl Michael Bellman songs from his 1790 Fredman's Epistles, and was a commercial success for Vreeswijk. The title phrase "Spring mot Ulla, spring!" is a line in Epistle 67, "Fader Movitz, Bror", which is the first track in the album.

Track listing

All songs by Carl Michael Bellman.

 Epistel no. 67 - Fader Movitz, Bror
 Epistel no. 43 - Värm mer öl och bröd
 Epistel no. 40 - Ge rum i bröllopsgåln
 Epistel no. 36 - Vår Ulla låg i sängen och sov
 Epistel no. 72 - Glimmande nymf
 Epistel no. 68 - Movitz i afton står baln
 Epistel no. 28 - I går såg jag ditt barn, min Fröja
 Epistel no. 48 - Solen glimmar blank och trind
 Epistel no. 7  - Fram med basfiolen, knäpp och skruva
 Epistel no. 81 - Märk hur vår skugga
 Epistel no. 24 - Kära syster, mig nu lyster
 Epistel no. 27 - Gubben är gammal, urverket dras
 Epistel no. 71 - Ulla, min Ulla, säj, får jag dig bjuda

References

Cornelis Vreeswijk albums
1971 albums
Carl Michael Bellman